Stigmella azusa is a moth of the family Nepticulidae. It is known from Japan (Honshū).

The larvae feed on Salix serissaefolia. They probably mine the leaves of their host plant.

External links
Nepticulidae and Opostegidae of the world

Nepticulidae
Moths of Japan
Moths described in 2010